Anastreptus is a genus of giant African millipedes in family Spirostreptidae, containing four species:
 Anastreptus andreini (Brölemann, 1903)
 Anastreptus entomotropis (Chamberlin, 1927)
 Anastreptus scalatus (Karsch, 1881)
 Anastreptus strongylotropis (Attems, 1914)

References

Spirostreptida
Millipedes of Africa